The first season of Solsidan, a Swedish television comedy series, created by comedian and actor Felix Herngren, Jacob Seth Fransson, Ulf Kvensler and Pontus Edgren premiered on January 29, 2010 on TV4 and ended on April 9, 2010. The series is about Alex (Felix Herngren) and Anna (Mia Skäringer), a couple expecting their first child and planning to move to where Alex grew up, the posh neighbourhood of Solsidan, the name of which means "The Sunny Side". The show has been sold internationally and will be aired in Norway, Denmark, Finland and Iceland. On December 3, 2010, the producers announced that the script to the series had been sold to the American network ABC, which plans to create their own version of the series to air in the United States.

Plot
Alex is a thirty-nine-year-old dentist, who moves back to his childhood home in Saltsjöbaden, Stockholm, along with his pregnant girlfriend Anna. Anna works as an actor and feels like an outsider in Alex's old neighbourhood. Alex's mother Margareta has sold the couple her house, but thinks that she still lives there. Fredde is Alex's childhood friend who lives down the block with his wife Mickan and two children. Ove Sundberg is another of Alex childhood friends who is believed to be the dullest and greediest resident in Solsidan.

Cast
The first season has four main characters as well as several recurring characters:

Alex Löfström (Felix Herngren)
Anna Svensson (Mia Skäringer)
Fredde Schiller (Johan Rheborg)
Mickan Schiller (Josephine Bornebusch)
Margareta Löfström (Mona Malm)
Lussan (Rebecka Englund)
Ove Sundberg (Henrik Dorsin)
Anette Sundberg (Malin Cederbladh)
Palle Svensson (Magnus Krepper)
Victor Schiller (Carl Sjögren)
Ebba Schiller (Ester Granholm and Otilia Anttila)

Episodes

References

External links
Official website
Solsidan on Facebook

2010 Swedish television seasons
1